Dermatocarpon arnoldianum, also known vernacularly as Arnold's silverskin lichen, is a species of lichen belonging to the family Verrucariaceae. Part of the genus Dermatocarpon, it has been found in Great Britain, Ireland, Austria, Bulgaria and France.

References 

Verrucariales 
Lichen species
Lichens described in 1934